Elections for one third (23 seats) of Bristol City Council were held on 2 May 2013 as part of the 2013 United Kingdom local elections. No party gained overall control of the chamber, although administrative power rested with the Mayor of Bristol, who had been first elected in November 2012

The Liberal Democrats, who had been the largest party on the council, lost 10 seats and conceded largest party status to Labour. The Green Party also gained 2 new seats, whilst Independents for Bristol gained their first seat on the council.

Ward results

Ashley

Avonmouth

Bishopston

Cabot

Clifton

Clifton East

Cotham

Easton

Eastville

Frome Vale

Henbury

Henleaze

Hillfields

Horfield

Kingsweston

Lawrence Hill

Lockleaze

Redland

Southmead

St George East

St George West

Stoke Bishop

Westbury-on-Trym

Notes

References

2013 English local elections
2013
2010s in Bristol